At about 10am on 25 January 2016, a quadruple suicide bombing occurred in Bodo, Far North Region, Cameroon. It killed over 30 people and injured about 65 others. Two bombers struck the village's market; the others struck the entry and exit points.

Jihadist group Boko Haram began an insurgency in Nigeria in 2009. In the mid-2010s, it intensified and spread to neighbouring countries Cameroon, Chad and Niger. Boko Haram are suspected of being the perpetrators of this attack. Boko Haram have carried out many attacks in the Far North Region, including a double suicide bombing in Bodo on 28 December 2015.

References

Boko Haram in Cameroon
Far North Region (Cameroon)